Pietro Paolo Russo (1611–1657) was a Roman Catholic prelate who served as Bishop of Nusco (1649–1657).

Biography
Pietro Paolo Russo was born in Santomenna, Italy in 1611.
On 1 March 1649, he was appointed during the papacy of Pope Innocent X as Bishop of Nusco.
On 7 March 1649, he was consecrated bishop by Bernardino Spada, Cardinal-Priest of San Pietro in Vincoli, with Sallustio Pecólo, Bishop Emeritus of Venosa, and Donato Pascasio, Bishop of Trevico, serving as co-consecrators. 
He served as Bishop of Nusco until his death in May 1657.

References

External links and additional sources
 (for Chronology of Bishops) 
 (for Chronology of Bishops) 

17th-century Italian Roman Catholic bishops
Bishops appointed by Pope Innocent X
1611 births
1657 deaths